Opacuincola eduardstraussi is a critically endangered species of fresh water snail native to New Zealand.

Habitat 
This snail has been found in only one location in a stream in Twinforks Cave, Paturau in the Tasman District of New Zealand. The population trend of this snail is unknown at present but it is regarded as potentially threatened by land clearance, water pollution and damage by cattle.

Conservation Status 
In 2013 the Department of Conservation classified Opacuincola eduardstraussi as Nationally Critical under the New Zealand Threat Classification System. The species was judged as meeting the criteria for Nationally Critical threat status as a result of it occupying a total area of less than 1 hectare. It is found only in one location and is also classified as Data Poor under the threat classification system.

References

External links

Gastropods described in 2008
Endangered biota of New Zealand
Gastropods of New Zealand
Tateidae
Endemic molluscs of New Zealand
Endemic fauna of New Zealand